The Chorus Lady is a 1924 American silent drama film directed by Ralph Ince and starring Margaret Livingston, Alan Roscoe, and Virginia Lee Corbin. It is based on the play of the same name by James Forbes, which was previously filmed in 1915 as The Chorus Lady.

Plot
Entertainer Patricia O'Brien (Livingston) is engaged to Dan Mallory (Roscoe), who races horses. When his prize horse "Lady Belle" is blinded in a fire, the wedding is postponed. Patricia returns to New York City with her younger sister Nora (Corbin) to work in the Follies. Dan enters his blind horse in a $20,000 race and wins, so he goes to New York City to finish the wedding. Things go awry when he finds Patricia in the apartment of Dick Crawford (McCullough). However, it turns out that she went there to rescue her younger sister Nora.

Cast

Preservation
The Chorus Lady is considered to be a lost film.

References

Bibliography
 Darby, William (1991). Masters of Lens and Light: A Checklist of Major Cinematographers and Their Feature Films. Scarecrow Press.

External links

 (novelization of the play illustrated with stills from the 1924 film)
Still with Margaret Livingston in costume at the Follies at gettyimages.com

1924 films
1924 drama films
1920s English-language films
American silent feature films
Silent American drama films
American black-and-white films
Films directed by Ralph Ince
Producers Distributing Corporation films
1920s American films